Kevin Stillmock is an American cable television entrepreneur.  In 1996, at age 19, he became the youngest person ever to found a cable TV specialty channel, the now-defunct Edge TV.

Biography

Early career
Stillmock began his career while he was still a student at The Education Channel in Towson, Maryland as an intern, where he served as a production assistant.  He was credited as segment producer on a number of occasions.

The Edge TV Years
In 1996,  Kevin Stillmock launched Edge TV utilizing Hughes satellite for uplink coverage and a network of over 100 college cable television channels across the United States for distribution.

Later career
Kevin Stillmock became the Chief Media Strategist for Destiny Channel in 2004 and co-created the Extreme Destiny programming block for that television channel.  Destiny Channel no longer broadcasts; much of its programming slate has been merged with a different, larger cable network.

Milestones
 Pet Projects: A television documentary series that featured Brittany Murphy was one of the first animal-oriented television series that Animal Planet later made famous.
 Academy of Television Arts and Sciences College TV Awards: Under Stillmock's leadership, the Academy's College TV Awards were broadcast on national television for the first time.  They were hosted by the now late African-American screenwriter Erich Leon Harris.
 No Doubt: Edge TV was the first national television station to broadcast a music video by the band No Doubt.

References

External links
 
 Variety article mentioning Stillmock

Living people
Year of birth missing (living people)